Sonia Herman Dolz (born 15 November 1962 in Madrid) is a Dutch film director, screenwriter and documentary filmmaker, who gained international fame in 1993 with her documentary "Romance de Valentía" about the Spanish bullfighting.

Life and work 
Dolz is the daughter of the Czech-Peruvian economist Herman Dolz and the visual artist Dora Dolz, who came with her parents to the Netherlands at the age of three. She grew up in Rotterdam and studied Spanish language and literature at the University of Leiden. She also studied film and directing at the Free Academy in The Hague, where she graduated in 1994.

Since 1993 she has been working as a filmmaker, screenwriter, photographer and occasionally as a producer, camera-woman and sound-woman. Between 1993 and 1996 she also worked as a documentary maker for the VPRO program Diogenes, and since then she works on her own films.

In 1993, she broke through internationally with her first feature documentary "Romance de Valentía" about the Spanish bullfighting, which was awarded at several European film festivals.  Her film "Lagrimas Negras" (1997) about the Cuban old timers band Vieja Trova Santiaguera, won multiple awards, and anticipated Wim Wenders' Buena Vista Social Club, (1999).  Sonia's subsequent documentaries include "The Master and His Pupil" about the Russian conductor Valery Gergiev, and filmic portraits of the Dutch folk singer Frédérique Spigt, and Sonia's mother, artist Dora Dolz.

Sonia's work is distinguished several times among others with the Golden Calf Special Jury Prize in 1998; as the best documentary at the Golden Prague Festival 2003; as best documentary at the Bergen International Film Festival in 2004; and with the Pendrecht Culture Prize in 2007 in Rotterdam.

Honors
Romance de Valentía, 1993
 Golden Hugo for Best Documentary, Chicago International Film Festival, 1994
 Best Documentary, Festróia Festival Internacional de Cinema de Tróia, Portugal, 1994
 Certificate of Merit, San Francisco International Film Festival, 1994

Lágrimas Negras, 1997
 Golden Calf, Special Jury Award, Netherlands Film Festival, 1998
 Gouden Beeld 'Academy Award', Netherlands Academy Award Foundation, 1999
 Holland Film Award, 1999
 Golden Plaque, Chicago International Film Festival, 1998
 Audience Award and Silver Spire Award, San Francisco International Film Festival, 1998
 Audience Award, Chicago Latino Film Festival, 1999

Yo soy así, 2000
 Grand Prize for Best Feature Documentary, International Documentary Festival Encontros Internacionais Cinema, Lisbon, 2000
 Prize of the Association of Cinematographers, International Documentary Festival Encontros Internacionais Cinema, Lisbon, 2000
 Premio F.A.D. de Artes Parateatrales, Barcelona, 2000

Master and His Pupil, 2003
 Golden Prague Award for Best Documentary, International Television Festival, Prague, 2003
 Best Documentary, Tribeca Film Festival, New York, 2004
 Gouden Beeld 'Academy Award', Netherlands Academy Award Foundation, 2004
 Best documentary, Bergen International Festival, Norway, 2004
 Prix de l'AQCC (Association Québécoise des Critiques) / AQCC Award, Festival du Nouveau Cinéma, Montreal, 2004

Filmography, a selection 
 1993: Romance de Valentía (Only The Brave)
 1997. Lágrimas Negras (Black Tears)
 2000. Yo Soy Así (This Is Me)
 2003. The Master and His Pupil
 2004. Mans genoeg
 2004. She Came To Win
 2006. Portrait of Dora Dolz
 2009. Blanco - The Hidden Language of the Soul
 2010. All My Tomorrows
 2012. De balletmeesters
 2015. Conducting Boijmans

References

External links 
 
  filmfestival.nl on the movies of Sonia Herman Dolz.

1962 births
Living people
Dutch film directors
Dutch women film directors
Leiden University alumni
People from Madrid